Movraž ( or ) is a small village in the City Municipality of Koper in the Littoral region of Slovenia.

The parish church in the settlement is dedicated to the Assumption of Mary.

References

External links

Movraž on Geopedia
Movraž on Google Maps (map, photographs, street view)

Populated places in the City Municipality of Koper